The 37th Ariel Awards ceremony, organized by the Mexican Academy of Film Arts and Sciences (AMACC) took place on June 26, 1995, in Mexico City. During the ceremony, AMACC presented the Ariel Award in 21 categories honoring films released in 1994. El Callejón de los Milagros received eleven awards out of 22 nominations, including Best Picture and Best Director for Jorge Fons. Bienvenido — Welcome followed with six awards; Dos Crímenes with three; Hasta Morir with two; and Un Volcán con Lava de Hielo with one.

Winners and nominees
Winners are listed first and highlighted with boldface.

Special awards
Golden Ariel – Manuel Esperón
Salvador Toscano Medal – Lupita Marino
Special recognition – Carmen Montejo

Multiple nominations and awards

The following eight films received multiple nominations:

Films that received multiple awards:

References

Ariel Awards ceremonies
1995 film awards
1995 in Mexico